HS-127 may refer to:

Hutchinson HS-127, American mid-wing glider built in 1956
Henschel Hs 127, 1930s German bomber